Abdulamir Al-Matrouk (born 8 October 1972) is a Kuwaiti diver. He competed in the 1996 Summer Olympics.

References

1972 births
Living people
Divers at the 1996 Summer Olympics
Kuwaiti male divers
Olympic divers of Kuwait